Dagoberto Gama (born December 22, 1959 in Coyuca de Catalán, Guerrero, Mexico) is a Mexican television and film actor. He is well known for his recurring role in the television series La Reina del Sur as El Pote and Sin senos sí hay paraíso as Gato Gordo.

Filmography

Film

Television

References

External links 
 

Living people
Mexican male film actors
Mexican male telenovela actors
Mexican male television actors
21st-century Mexican male actors
1959 births